The Stand-in is a 1999 American film by "Good To Be Seen Films" directed by Roberto Monticello. The plot concerns a struggling actor who takes inspiration from his day-job, care of an injured black athlete. The cast features Robbie Bryan, Joseph Barbara, Judith Ivey, and David Ogden Stiers.

References

External links
 

1999 films
1999 drama films
American drama films
1990s American films